Cross-validation may refer to:

 Cross-validation (statistics), a technique for estimating the performance of a predictive model
 Cross-validation (analytical chemistry), the practice of confirming an experimental finding by repeating the experiment using an independent assay technique

See also 
 Validation (disambiguation)